Barret L. Rey is an American college baseball coach. Rey previously served as head coach of the Grambling State Tigers baseball team from 2007 through 2009 and the Alcorn State Braves baseball team from 2010 through 2015.

Southern
Rey was a four-year letterman as a pitcher at Southern, where he helped lead the Jaguars to a pair of NCAA Regional appearances, earned All-SWAC twice, and recorded a 21–6 record with 156 strikeouts, 13 complete games, and 3 shutouts.  Rey remains among the school's leaders in many pitching categories, and is best remembered for his 7–0 freshman campaign.  After completing his eligibility, Rey served one year as a graduate assistant while completing his degree, then became a full-time assistant with the Jaguars.  The Jaguars continued their dominance of the SWAC, winning six Southwestern Athletic Conference baseball tournament titles in nine years.  Rey added recruiting coordinator duties, and was instrumental in recruiting and coaching 21 future draft picks, including Rickie Weeks to Southern.  Rey also completed a master's degree at Southern in 2003.

Head coaching career
Following the 2006 season, Rey was hired as head coach at Grambling State.  The Tigers had not appeared in the SWAC Tournament in seven years, and had finished just 6–36 the previous season.  Under Rey, the Tigers qualified for a pair of SWAC Tournaments in three years, and compiled a record of 56–94.  Citing a desire to be closer to his wife and children, Rey accepted the head coaching job at SWAC rival Alcorn State beginning in 2010.  In his second season, the Braves claimed the top record in the league, won the East Division, and won the SWAC Tournament to qualify for their first NCAA Regional.  Rey was named SWAC Coach of the Year for his efforts.

Head coaching record

See also
List of current NCAA Division I baseball coaches

References

Living people
Alcorn State Braves baseball coaches
Baseball pitchers
Grambling State Tigers baseball coaches
Southern Jaguars baseball coaches
Southern Jaguars baseball players
Year of birth missing (living people)
Baseball players from New Orleans